Seble-Hiwot Wagaw, Ph.D. is an organic chemist and senior leader at AbbVie pharmaceuticals outside Chicago, IL.

Background and Education 
Wagaw was born in Addis Ababa, Ethiopia and emigrated to the United States in 1974. Her father, Teshome Gebremichael Wagaw, was a faculty member at the University of Michigan for 28 years, and her mother is Tsehai Wolde-Tsadik.  She is one of three children, with an older brother and sister.  She received her Bachelor's and MS degrees in Chemistry from the University of Michigan in 1994, and a Ph.D. in organic chemistry with Stephen L. Buchwald at the Massachusetts Institute of Technology in 1999. Her research in the Buchwald lab utilized chiral complexes of Palladium to forge new carbon-nitrogen bonds on Aryl rings.

Career 
As a Senior Director for process research and R&D at Abbott Laboratories (later AbbVie) for her entire career, Wagaw has published research on enantiomerically enriched lead molecules using Pybox ligands. She has led exploration into new technologies for her process group, including explorations of flow chemistry and commercial-scale electrochemistry.

She is on the advisory board for Asymchem and co-founded the Cross-industry Women's chemical process group.

Awards and recognition 

 2020 - Keynote speaker, CERM2020
 2015 - Samuel M. McElvain seminar, University of Wisconsin
 2013 - American Chemical Society WCC Rising Stars Award
 2004 - Women of Color Research investigators
 1995 - Ford Foundation pre-doctoral fellowship, MIT

References 

Pharmaceutical scientists
Process chemicals
Massachusetts Institute of Technology School of Science alumni
AbbVie
American women scientists